The Cathedral Church and Minor Basilica of Saint Patrick (colloquially St Patrick's Cathedral) is the cathedral church of the Roman Catholic Archdiocese of Melbourne in Victoria, Australia, and seat of its archbishop, currently Peter Comensoli.

In 1974 Pope Paul VI conferred the title and dignity of minor basilica on it. In 1986 Pope John Paul II visited the cathedral and addressed clergy during his papal visit.

The cathedral is built on a traditional east–west axis, with the altar at the eastern end, symbolising belief in the resurrection of Christ. The plan is in the style of a Latin cross, consisting of a nave with side aisles, transepts with side aisles, a sanctuary with seven chapels, and sacristies. Although its  length is marginally shorter than that of St Mary's Cathedral, Sydney, St Patrick's has the distinction of being both the tallest and, overall, the largest church building in Australia.

Location
The cathedral is located on Eastern Hill in Melbourne, in an area bounded by Albert Street, Gisborne Street, Lansdowne Street and Cathedral Place. Just to the west across Gisborne Street is St Peter's Church, constructed from 1846 to 1848, which is the Anglican parish church of Melbourne.

History
In 1848, the Augustinian friar James Goold  was appointed the first bishop of Melbourne and became the fourth bishop in Australia, after Sydney, Hobart and Adelaide. Negotiations with the colonial government for the grant of five acres of land for a church in the Eastern Hill area began in 1848. On 1 April 1851, only 16 years after the foundation of Melbourne, the Colonial Secretary of Victoria finally granted the site to the Roman Catholic Church.

Goold decided to build his cathedral on the Eastern Hill site.

Since the Catholic community of Melbourne was at the time almost entirely Irish, the cathedral was dedicated to St Patrick, the patron saint of Ireland.

William Wardell, Melbourne's foremost ecclesiastical architect was commissioned to prepare plans for a cathedral, but the project was delayed by severe labour shortages during the Gold Rush of 1851, which drew almost every able-bodied man in the colony to the goldfields, and the foundation stone was not laid until 1858. An earlier building by stonemason David Mitchell (father of Nellie Melba and later partner of John Monash) was demolished for the cathedral. The cathedral was designed in the Gothic style of late thirteenth century, based on the great medieval cathedrals of England, in response to the revival of Gothic architecture as promoted by Augustus Welby Pugin and others as the most appropriate for the building of churches. The style is specifically Geometric Decorated Gothic, showing this style at its most complex in the large west window of the nave. The eastern arm with its chevet of radiating chapels in the French manner is still principally in the English late thirteenth century style, giving the most complete essay attempted in that style during the nineteenth century. William Wardell was a remarkably ambitious and capable architect; he went on to design the second St Mary's Cathedral, Sydney, in a similar style, even larger than St Patrick's, but with a completely English square East End.

In 1974 Pope Paul VI conferred the title and dignity of minor basilica on it. In 1986 Pope John Paul II visited the cathedral and addressed clergy during his papal visit. The building also saw a green ban in the 1970s.

Construction
In 1858 William Wardell was commissioned to plan the cathedral with a contract signed on 8 December 1858 and building commencing the same year.

Although the nave was completed within 10 years, construction proceeded slowly, and was further delayed by the severe depression which hit Melbourne in 1891. Under the leadership of Archbishop Thomas Carr the cathedral was consecrated in 1897 and even then it was not finished. Given the size of the Catholic community at the time, the massive bluestone Gothic cathedral was an immense and very expensive undertaking, and there were long delays while funds were raised. St Patrick's was one of the two largest churches brought to substantial completion anywhere in the world in the 19th century. The other is St Patrick's Cathedral, New York, United States.

Daniel Mannix, who became Archbishop of Melbourne in 1917, maintained a constant interest in the cathedral, which he was determined to see finished after the long delays during the previous 30 years. He oversaw the addition of the spires and other elements in the late 1930s. The building was officially completed in 1939.

The bluestone used in its construction was sourced from basalt deposits in nearby Footscray.

Restoration
To celebrate the centenary of its consecration in 1997, the cathedral was closed throughout 1994 to be upgraded. Nothing was added to the main building. Rather, it underwent significant conservation work, with funds contributed by the federal and Victorian governments, corporate and philanthropic donors and the community of Melbourne.

The cathedral's stained glass windows had buckled and cracked and required a full year to restore to their original state. Teams of stonemasons and stained-glass craftsmen used "lime mortars and materials long-forgotten by the building trade — like medieval times". The 1992–97 restoration works were undertaken under the guidance of Falkinger Andronas Architects and Heritage Consultants. The works were awarded the Royal Australian Institute of Architects (Victorian Chapter) John George Knight Award for Heritage Architecture 1996. One of the gargoyles restored by the masonry team was modelled on the then-Premier of Victoria, Jeff Kennett.

Music

Cathedral choir
There has been music at St Patrick's since 1858, but the present cathedral choir was founded in 1939 when the Vienna Mozart Boys Choir found itself stranded in Australia at the outbreak of war. The National Museum of Australia holds a collection of the choir's memorabilia from this period. St Patrick's choir has between 50 and 60 members who are all students of St Kevin's College in Toorak, through a scholarship program from the archdiocese. The choir has made commercial recordings in the past, mainly from the 1950s to 1990s. Selected recording before the 1980s have been deposited with the National Film and Sound Archive (Screensound Australia).

Cathedral singers
Formed in May 1996, the St Patrick's Cathedral Singers supplement the musical resources of the cathedral. The choir has been directed since 2015 by Mr Christopher Mason. The Singers sing weekly at the Sunday 6:30pm Mass. Entrance is by audition and some scholarships are available to eligible students.

Pipe organs
The cathedral's original pipe organ was built in the late 1870s by Robert Mackenzie and completed in 1880 by George Fincham. The current installation built by George Fincham & Sons, Melbourne in 1962–64 and incorporates a substantial part of the original. Installed in the west gallery of the cathedral, it comprises 81 speaking stops spread over four manuals and pedals. Some of the stops can be dated to 1880 or 1896, when the instrument was enlarged. The organ was refurbished in 1996–97 for the centenary of the cathedral. In addition to serving the liturgical needs of the cathedral, the organ is occasional used for recitals and recordings.

Bells
The bells of the cathedral were acquired by Bishop Goold, Melbourne's Roman Catholic leader at the time, when he visited Europe in 1851–1852. He bought a peal of eight bells for £500 (with some records showing that it cost £700). They arrived in Australia in 1853. The peal of eight bells is in F natural, with the tenor weighing  and the treble . The bells were all cast by John Murphy of Dublin in 1852.

The bells were hung in a low frame at ground level in the western aisle in 1868. The consecration service was attended by around 5,000 people. The eight bell bears the coat of arms of Bishop Goold. The bells were eventually hung at the south-eastern tower.

The ringers of St Patrick's began the custom of ringing in the New Year in 1871. And by the 1880s, St Patrick's Cathedral became the leading tower for Australian change ringing. The bells were rung for the requiem mass of Pope Pius X in 1914. By 1959 the belfry fell into disrepair and the bells became unringable. The bells remained silent until in 1988, when the peal was sent to Eayre and Smith Bell foundry in England as the major Victorian project among Bicententennial bell restorations. Upon their return, a ninth bell, an Angelus bell, was added. An electronic chiming mechanism was also installed at this time for all the bells. The original manual method was retained by the electronic mechanism, in order to replicate how the bells would have sounded if they were rung by hand. The entire eight headstocks had to be replaced just ten years after this installation. The ringers are affiliated with The Australian and New Zealand Association of Bellringers.

The bells are unusual in that they were cast untuned, they ring anti-clockwise instead of clockwise, and they are thought to be the only ring of eight bells cast by Murphy which are still in operation today.

Photo gallery

See also
List of cathedrals in Australia

Notes

References

External links

St Patrick's Cathedral website

Roman Catholic churches completed in 1939
Patrick's
Patrick's
Patrick's
Patrick's
Patrick's
Roman Catholic Archdiocese of Melbourne
William Wardell church buildings
Gothic Revival church buildings in Australia
Cathedrals in Melbourne
Landmarks in Melbourne
Green bans
1939 establishments in Australia
20th-century Roman Catholic church buildings in Australia
Buildings and structures in the City of Melbourne (LGA)